"New Truck" is a song by American country music singer Dylan Scott. It was released on August 9, 2021, as the lead single from his second studio album Livin' My Best Life. The song was written by Ashley Gorley, Ben Johnson, Hunter Phelps and Hardy, and produced by Will Weatherly, Matt Alderman, Curt Gibbs and Jim Ed Norman. It reached number one on the Billboard Country Airplay chart in August 2022, becoming Scott's second number one on that chart, and his first since "My Girl" in July 2017.

Content
"New Truck" is a song about a breakup that was inspired by Scott breaking up with his now-wife, Blair Robinson, for several months. Scott explained that it is about a man finding his partner's belongings when sitting in his truck, thus wanting a new truck to stop remembering them. "We've all been in a situation where you and your significant other have broken up, and it's tough. Every time you get back in your truck, you go back to certain memories of them in there as well." Scott wrote the song with Ashley Gorley, Ben Johnson, Hunter Phelps, and Michael Hardy. Scott told American Songwriter that "I have to find stuff that's relatable to me, and 'New Truck' is one of those. It relates to my life, so why try to write something else when I could just record this great song?"

Critical reception
The song was described by Jess of Taste of Country as "relatively upbeat for being filled with heartbreak". Off the Record UK published an uncredited review, which called the song "a fiery break-up anthem that is brought to life on his gritty new music video that will set his memories ablaze".

Charts

Weekly charts

Year-end charts

References

2021 singles
2021 songs
Dylan Scott songs
Songs written by Ashley Gorley
Songs written by Hardy (singer)
Song recordings produced by Jim Ed Norman
Curb Records singles
Songs about cars